Beșalma is a commune and village in the Gagauz Autonomous Territorial Unit of the Republic of Moldova. The 2004 census listed the commune as having a population of 4,441 people, including 4,293 ethnic Gagauz, 44 Moldovans, 37 Ukrainians, 33 Russians, 25 Bulgarians and 5 Romanians.

References

Communes of Gagauzia